Gustave-Henri Colin (1828–1910) was a French painter.

Early life
Gustave-Henri Colin was born on July 11, 1828, in Arras, France. He learned painting from Constant Dutilleux in Arras. Upon moving to Paris, he took lessons from Ary Scheffer and Thomas Couture.

Career
Colin was a painter. He painted landscapes and portraits. He exhibited his first painting, Portrait of a Grandmother, at the Salon in Paris in 1857. A year later, in 1858, he established a studio in Ciboure near Biarritz. By 1863, he exhibited his work at the Salon des Refusés in Paris.

Colin spent time at the Château d'Orrouy, a castle owned by Count Armand Doria, an aristocrat and art collector. He met James McNeill Whistler in Saint-Jean-de-Luz in 1862.

Personal life
Colin was married to a Basque.

Death
Colin died on December 28, 1910, in Paris, France.

References

1828 births
1910 deaths
People from Arras
19th-century French painters
Academic staff of the Académie Julian
École des Beaux-Arts alumni